Allan W. "Copper" Kent (10 February 1891 – 28 May 1966) was a rugby union player who represented Australia.

Kent, a flanker, was born in Toowoomba, Queensland and claimed 1 international rugby cap for Australia.

See also
 1912 Australia rugby union tour of Canada and the U.S.

References

Australian rugby union players
Australia international rugby union players
1891 births
Rugby union flankers
1966 deaths
Rugby union players from Queensland